George Philip Hahn (June 26, 1879 – February 12, 1937) was a United States district judge of the United States District Court for the Northern District of Ohio.

Education and career

Born in Napoleon, Ohio, Hahn received a Bachelor of Laws from the Ohio State University Moritz College of Law in 1905. He was in private practice in Toledo, Ohio from 1905 to 1928.

Federal judicial service

On December 6, 1928, Hahn was nominated by President Calvin Coolidge to a seat on the United States District Court for the Northern District of Ohio vacated by Judge John Milton Killits. Hahn was confirmed by the United States Senate on December 17, 1928, and received his commission the same day. He served in that capacity until his death on February 12, 1937.

Memberships

Hahn was a director of the University of Toledo, which conferred upon him the honorary degree Doctor of Laws. He was President of the Toledo Bar Association, member of the Ohio and American Bar Associations, a Lutheran Church member, Republican and in the BPOE.

Personal

Hahn married Stella Vocke of Napoleon on November 14, 1906, and had one son and one daughter.

References

Sources
 

1879 births
1937 deaths
Judges of the United States District Court for the Northern District of Ohio
United States district court judges appointed by Calvin Coolidge
20th-century American judges
Ohio Republicans
Ohio State University Moritz College of Law alumni
Lawyers from Toledo, Ohio
People from Napoleon, Ohio